Conque may refer to:
Conch (instrument), a wind instrument made from a conch shell

People with the surname
Abraham ben Levi Conque (1648 – after 1689), rabbi and kabbalist in Hebron
Clint Conque (born 1961), American college football coach

See also
Conch, a medium- to large-sized sea snail or shell
Conk (disambiguation)
Conquer (disambiguation)
Conques, a former commune in the Aveyron department of France